The Virgin of Lust is a 2002 Mexican drama film directed by Arturo Ripstein.

Plot
The film is set in Mexico in the 1940s. Nacho (Luis Felipe Tovar) works for tyrannical racist Don Lázaro (Julián Pastor) in the Café Ofelia. He falls in love with the Spanish prostitute Lola (Ariadna Gil).

Cast 
 Luis Felipe Tovar - Nacho
 Ariadna Gil - Lola
 Patricia Reyes Spíndola - Raquel
 Juan Diego - Gimeno-Mikado
 Julián Pastor - Don Lázaro
 Alberto Estrella - Gardenia
 Daniel Giménez Cacho - Toledano

Awards
Fipreci Prize at the Rio de Janeiro International Film Festival (2002)

References

External links 

2002 drama films
2002 films
Mexican drama films
2000s Mexican films